Kevin Harcourt Bell  (born 13 November 1954) is a former judge of the Supreme Court of Victoria, in the Australian state of Victoria.

Early life and education
Bell was born on 13 November 1954.

He holds a Bachelor of Arts and a Bachelor of Laws with honours from Monash University.

Career
Bell served as a judge of the Supreme Court of Victoria between February 2005 and March 2012.

In May 2021, Bell was appointed as a Commissioner on the Yoorrook Justice Commission. The Yoorrook Justice Commission is a Royal Commission established by the  Victorian Government to examine past and ongoing injustices to the First People of Victoria resulting from colonisation  to provide a culturally safe place in which First People and others can tell the truth about traumatic events that have happened and their effects, to identify systemic injustice in Victoria and propose reforms to end that injustice and to propose matters that might be included in Victoria’s ongoing treaty-making processes.

Owing to this appointment, Bell stood down as Director of the Castan Centre for Human Rights Law in 2022 and was succeeded by Melissa Castan. Bell was then appointed as an academic member of the Castan Centre and Adjunct Professor in the Faculty of Law at Monash University.

Other activities
Bell served as the President of the Victorian Civil and Administrative Tribunal (VCAT) between February 2008 and 2010. 

Bell was also previously elected as a Councillor of the City of Essendon, where he was active in establishing the Essendon Community Legal Centre.

Honours
In 2017 Justice Bell was appointed a Member of the Order of Australia for significant service to the law and to the judiciary, to native title and human rights, and to the community.

References 

1954 births
Living people
Judges of the Supreme Court of Victoria
Australian King's Counsel
Monash Law School alumni
Members of the Order of Australia
People from Carlton, Victoria
Judges from Melbourne
Victoria (Australia) local councillors